This was the first edition of the tournament at the Challenger level.

Dudi Sela won the title after defeating Thomas Fabbiano 4–6, 6–4, 6–3 in the final.

Seeds

Draw

Finals

Top half

Bottom half

References
Main Draw
Qualifying Draw

Nottingham Open - Men's Singles
2017 Men's Singles
2017 Nottingham Open